is a Japanese place name. 

 Motomachi, Hakodate, a district in Hakodate, Hokkaido Prefecture
 Motomachi, Kobe, a district in Kobe, Hyōgo Prefecture
 Motomachi, Nagasaki, a district in Nagasaki, Nagasaki Prefecture
 Motomachi, Yokohama, a district in Yokohama, Kanagawa Prefecture
 Toyota's Motomachi manufacturing plant in Toyota City, Aichi Prefecture

See also 
 Motomachi Station (disambiguation)